Jimmy Davis Hitchcock, Jr. (born November 9, 1970) is a former American football cornerback in the National Football League. He played for the New England Patriots, the Minnesota Vikings, and the Carolina Panthers. He played college football at the University of North Carolina. In 1997 Hitchcock became the record holder for the longest interception return in Patriots history with a 100-yard pick six against the Miami Dolphins. In 1998, he led the league in interception yards with 242 yards and defensive touchdowns with three. Remarkably, Hitchcock played his entire professional and collegiate careers without both of his ACL's in his knees.

References

1970 births
Living people
People from Concord, North Carolina
American football cornerbacks
North Carolina Tar Heels football players
New England Patriots players
Minnesota Vikings players
Carolina Panthers players
American sportspeople convicted of crimes